Celebrity Fifteen to One is a celebrity version of the Channel 4 game show Fifteen to One. William G. Stewart presented the first two episodes, which were Christmas specials that aired on 27 December 1990 and 30 December 1992. Adam Hills has hosted subsequent episodes on 20 September 2013, 6, 13, 20 and 27 June 2014, a Christmas special on 23 December 2014 and 7, 14, 21 and 28 August 2015.

Richard Whiteley, Anna Raeburn, Sally Jones and Rory McGrath appeared on both 1990s episodes, with Alex Brooker, Jimmy Carr, Johnny Vegas, Rhod Gilbert and Gyles Brandreth also having made appearances on more than one Hills episode. Of these, Brandreth is the only person to have made appearances on episodes presented by both hosts.

Episodes

William G. Stewart era
The first episode was broadcast on 27 December 1990. The format is largely the same as that of Fifteen to One, though with the Barry Cryer rule: Those who get both questions wrong may still play round 2 with one life remaining, with Cryer being the only one to miss both questions. Cryer was also the first contestant to be eliminated.  The programme is extended to 45 minutes from 30, with an extra advert added between the first and second rounds.

A second celebrity special aired on 30 December 1992. In his book "A Matter of Facts: An Insider's Guide To Quizzing", contestant Marcus Berkmann, who had previously appeared on a civilian episode of the show two years prior, explained that he was asked to appear on the programme after Vincent Hanna pulled out and noted that "clearly some barrels had been scraped for this, and [he] was at the bottom of the very last barrel". The winner, Patrick Stoddart, won by taking a step back from the rest of the semi-circle, resulting in no one nominating him in round 2. This would be the last Celebrity Fifteen to One for over twenty years.

Adam Hills era
The show was revived on 20 September 2013 as part of a 1980s night. This version was hosted by Adam Hills and was 1 hour long rather than 45 minutes and did not reprise what UKGameshows.com termed as the Barry Cryer rule; "just one life away for each incorrect answer in round one". It did, however, slash the number of questions in round three down to 25, and eliminated the need for three correct answers to start question or nominate. Money was awarded for getting to the final: £1,000 for getting there; £5,000 for coming second; £10,000 for coming first + £1,000 for however many lives they have left + £1,000 for getting any of the questions right after both the other finalists have been eliminated + £100 for every life they entered the round with. Jo Brand won this episode, winning £21,100 for her charity.

After the first show aired, it was announced by Channel 4 that the show would be revived for four more celebrity specials featuring Hills and for twenty daytime episodes featuring Sandi Toksvig. Changes were made; money was not awarded for lives left at the end of the round two, and for the last celebrity standing, the last five questions are worth £2,000 each. The winners of these programmes were Josie Long, who raised £25,000, Stephen Mangan and Dave Gorman, who both raised £23,000, and Sian Williams, who raised £22,000. These episodes were transmitted on 6, 13, 20 and 27 June 2015 respectively.

A Christmas special was broadcast on 23 December 2014. Rufus Hound raised £11,000 after a particularly tight final round in which all three contestants were standing at the end of 25 questions, and Hound opted to take two questions from 71–82 down with only one life left.

Four more episodes of Celebrity Fifteen to One were broadcast on 7, 14, 21 and 28 August 2015. Winners of these episodes were Alex James, who raised £11,000, Kate Humble, who raised £26,000, Gary Delaney, who raised £11,000 and Tanni Grey-Thompson, who raised £13,000.

William G. Stewart hosted two celebrity specials across 35 series. The revival shows include ten celebrity specials across four series of the main daytime show. The fourth series began on 18 September 2015.

References

1990 British television series debuts
2015 British television series endings
1990s British game shows
2010s British game shows
Channel 4 game shows
English-language television shows
British television series revived after cancellation